The individual dressage at the 1968 Summer Olympics took place between 24 and 25 October, at the Campo Marte. The event was open to men and women. The competition was held over two rounds; the top 7 horse and rider pairs in the first round advanced to the second round. The total score for both rounds determined final ranking.

Results

26 riders competed.

References

Equestrian at the 1968 Summer Olympics